Derborence is a 1985 French-Swiss drama film directed by Francis Reusser, based on Charles-Ferdinand Ramuz's 1934 novel of the same name. It was entered into the 1985 Cannes Film Festival.

Cast
 Isabel Otero as Thérèse Maye
 Jacques Penot as Antoine
 Maria Machado as Aline
 Jean-Marc Bory as Nendaz
 Bruno Cremer as Séraphin
 Jean-Pierre Sentier as Plan
 Jean-Noël Brouté as Dzozet
 Teco Celio as Biolla
 Jean-Marc Stehlé as Loutre
 Maria Carta as Singer
 Michèle Foucher

References

External links

1985 films
Swiss drama films
French drama films
1980s French-language films
1985 drama films
Films directed by Francis Reusser
French-language Swiss films
1980s French films

Films set in the Alps